This is a list of highest points in the U.S. state of Arizona, in alphabetical order by county. Elevations are from USGS 1:24,000 scale topographic quadrangle maps. Elevations followed by a plus sign (+) are minimal values. The contour interval is shown after the (+). 

Robert Walko listed the Arizona county high points and then hiked them in 1977. At that time there were only 14 counties in the state, as La Paz county was not split from Yuma county until 1983.

References

Bibliography and further reading
Surgent, Scott (2010). The County High Points of Arizona. Tempe, Az.: Xaler Press.

External links
Trip Reports
Scott Surgent's Trip Reports
Summitpost
Peakbagger Listing
Lists Of John Listing

Highest by county
Highest
Arizona
Arizona